Ammonium adipate is a compound with formula (NH4)2(C4H8(COO)2). It is the ammonium salt of adipic acid.  It is used as a food additive and has the E number E359.

Adipates
Ammonium compounds
Food additives